"Vive El Verano" is a song written by Richard Daniel Roman and Ignacio Ballesteros for Paulina Rubio's fifth album, Paulina. It was released on 19 June 2001. The song peaked at number eleven in Spain's singles chart and it also became one of the most add airplay songs on Radio Fiume Ticino in Switzerland.

Track listing and formats 
Spanish CD Single (1999 released)
 "Vive El Verano" (Latin Version) – 4:13
 "Vive El Verano" (Dance Version) – 4:13

Spanish CD Single (2001 released)
 "Vive El Verano" – 4:10

Spanish CD Single
 "Vive El Verano" – 4:10
 "Love Me Forever" – 4:10

Spanish Remixes
 "Vive El Verano" (Latin Remix) – 3:57
 "Vive El Verano" (Dance Remix) – 4:08
 "Love Me Forever" (Latin Remix) – 3:57
 "Love Me Forever" (Dance Remix) – 4:08
 "Vive El Verano" (Album Version) – 4:10

Italian 12" Vinyl
 A-1. "Vive El Verano" – 4:10
 A-2. "Lo Haré Por Ti" (Album Version) – 4:41
 B-1. "Lo Haré Por Ti" (Mijangos Extended Version) – 10:03

Italian CD Single
 "Vive El Verano" – 4:10
 "Tan Sola" – 5:20
 "Baby Paulina" – 0:18

Charts

Weekly charts

Year-end charts

Release history

References

2001 singles
Paulina Rubio songs
Spanish-language songs
Universal Music Latino singles
2001 songs
Songs written by Richard Daniel Roman